All the Good Pilgrims is a travel book by Canadian travel writer Robert Ward, published in May 2007 by Thomas Allen Publishers. It relates the author's adventures and encounters on his several journeys along Spain's Camino de Santiago pilgrimage road.

External links
 Robert Ward's official website

Canadian travel books
Books about Spain
Pilgrimage accounts
Camino de Santiago